Lamar Johnathan Peters (born June 19, 1998) is an American professional basketball player for Karditsa of the Greek Basket League. He played college basketball for the Mississippi State Bulldogs.

Early life and high school
Peters was born in New Orleans, Louisiana and grew up in the city's 9th Ward in a single parent household as his father was incarcerated for most of his childhood. He attended Landry-Walker College and Career Preparatory High School, where he helped lead the Charging Buccaneers to back-to-back state championships in his sophomore and junior seasons. He averaged 19.7 points and was named first team All-Metro by The New Orleans Advocate during his junior season. Peters committed to Mississippi State over offers from LSU, Baylor. South Carolina, Memphis, Texas, Miami (Fla.) and Illinois going into his senior year. He said he developed a relationship with Bulldogs assistant coach Korey McCray. As a senior, Peters averaged 26 points and five assists and was named first team 5A All-State by the LSWA and was named the Outstanding Player of the Year for the New Orleans Metro Area by The  Advocate.

College career
As a true freshman, Peters averaged 10.7 points and 3.4 assists per game and was named to the Southeastern Conference (SEC) All-Freshman team. He averaged 9.6 points and 4.5 assists in his sophomore season and was named the SEC co-Player of the Week on February 26, 2018 after averaging 17 points, 5.5 rebounds, six assists and 2.5 steals in wins over Texas A&M and South Carolina. He declared for the 2018 NBA draft, but ultimately decided to return for his junior year. As a junior, Peters averaged 11.9 points, 5.2 assists and 1.7 steals per game. Peters was named the SEC co-Player of the Week a second time on December 10, 2018 after he averaged 27.5 points, five assists and eight 3-pointers made per game in performances against Clemson and McNeese State. Following the end of the season he again entered the NBA Draft and hired an agent, forgoing his final season of eligibility.

Professional career
After going undrafted in the 2019 NBA draft, Peters joined the New York Knicks' summer league roster. Peters signed an Exhibit 10 contract with the Knicks on August 11, 2019. Peters was waived by the Knicks on October 19, 2019 and joined the team's NBA G League affiliate, the Westchester Knicks. On February 26, 2020, Peters set a new Westchester record with 19 assists to go with 19 points in a 129-115 win over the Greensboro Swarm. During the shortened 2019-20 season, Peters averaged 17.8 points, 7.3 assists, 2.8 rebounds, and 1.4 steals per game, shooting 42% from the field and 40% from three point range.

On December 6, 2020, he has signed with Frutti Extra Bursaspor of the Turkish Super League (BSL).

On November 2, 2021, he has signed with Baskonia of the Liga ACB. On February 10, 2022, Peters parted ways with the team.

On April 19, 2022, he has signed with Fuenlabrada of the Liga ACB.

On January 13, 2023, he signed with Karditsa of the Greek Basket League.

Personal life
Peters' best friend is Tyree Griffin, the point guard for Southern Miss. Peters' father, Walter Sterling, was killed in a shooting in New Orleans during his freshman season at Mississippi State.

References

External links
Mississippi State Bulldogs bio
NBA G League profile

1998 births
Living people
American expatriate basketball people in Greece
American expatriate basketball people in Spain
American expatriate basketball people in Turkey
American men's basketball players
ASK Karditsas B.C. players
Baloncesto Fuenlabrada players
Basketball players from New Orleans
Bursaspor Basketbol players
Mississippi State Bulldogs men's basketball players
Point guards
Saski Baskonia players
Westchester Knicks players